Fruit is the debut album by Danish band The Asteroids Galaxy Tour. It was released on September 21, 2009, in Europe, and October 27, 2009, in the US.

Track listing

Charts

References

External links
Official website

2009 debut albums
The Asteroids Galaxy Tour albums